The 2020 Michigan Wolverines football team represented the University of Michigan in the sport of college football during the 2020 NCAA Division I FBS football season. The Wolverines played in the East Division of the Big Ten Conference and played their home games at Michigan Stadium in Ann Arbor, Michigan. Michigan was coached by sixth-year head coach Jim Harbaugh.

The season was played amid the ongoing COVID-19 pandemic. The Big Ten Conference initially canceled the fall sports season, on August 11, 2020, but reversed course on September 16, announcing an eight-game conference-only schedule. Michigan's previously scheduled nonconference games against Washington, Ball State, and Arkansas State were canceled due to the pandemic. Precautions were taken to promote player, staff, and fan safety, including regular COVID-19 testing, isolation requirements, and mask wearing; games were largely played with no fans in attendance.

Michigan began the year ranked 16th in the preseason AP Poll. In the season's opening game against then-No. 21 Minnesota, Michigan won, on the road, 49–24. After rising to 13th in the polls, Michigan was upset by unranked in-state rival Michigan State. After losing two more games against ranked opponents Indiana and Wisconsin, Michigan won a triple-overtime game against Rutgers, and lost to Penn State the following week. Michigan's final three conference games, against Maryland, Ohio State, and Iowa, were canceled due to COVID-19 outbreaks. While the NCAA's win requirements for bowl eligibility were lifted for the season, Michigan was not selected to a bowl game for the first time since 2014, ending the season with a 2–4 record.

Quarterback Joe Milton began the season as the team's starting quarterback, but by the end of the season he had been replaced by backup Cade McNamara. The team's leading rusher was Hassan Haskins, with 375 yards, and the team's leading receiver was Ronnie Bell with 401 receiving yards. On defense, lineman Kwity Paye led the team in tackles-for-loss and was named second-team all-conference. Linebacker Josh Ross led the team in tackles.

Preseason

Coaching changes
It was announced a day after the Citrus Bowl that safeties coach and special teams coordinator Chris Partridge accepted a co-defensive coordinator role at Ole Miss.

Coronavirus
The COVID-19 pandemic led to the cancellation of all University of Michigan athletic activities during the spring of 2020, including the football team's annual spring game. The pandemic also led to cancellation of the team's international trip for the first time since 2016.

On July 9, the Big Ten Conference announced that it would adopt "a conference-only season" for all sports due to the coronavirus pandemic. The decision resulted in the cancellation of the first three games of Michigan's 2020 season against Washington, Ball State, and Arkansas State.

On August 11, the Big Ten announced that all fall sports, including football, would be indefinitely postponed due to COVID-19. The conference allowed for the possibility of competition in these sports to begin in the spring. However, the conference later announced the season would begin on October 23, with a schedule to be announced on September 19.

Recruiting
              
Michigan signed a total of 21 recruits in its 2020 recruiting class, including eight that enrolled early. The class was ranked 10th in the nation by 247Sports and 11th in the nation by Rivals.com.

Schedule

Michigan was originally scheduled to play non-conference games against Washington, Ball State, and Arkansas State; and conference games against Ohio State, Maryland, and Iowa. However those games were canceled due to the COVID-19 pandemic. The Big Ten Conference announced on July 9 that if the conference is to participate in a fall sports season, member schools will play a conference-only schedule. The Big Ten announced a revised schedule on August 5, which was scrapped when the conference announced postponement of the season on August 11. A new schedule was released on September 19.

Rankings

Radio
Radio coverage for all games was broadcast statewide on the Michigan Sports Network and on Sirius XM Satellite Radio and online via TuneIn. The radio announcers are Jim Brandstatter with play-by-play, Dan Dierdorf with color commentary, and Doug Karsch with sideline reports.

Game summaries

at Minnesota

Sources:

    
    
    
    
    
    
    
    
    
    

On October 24, Michigan opened its season with a 49–24 victory over Minnesota in Minneapolis. Michigan retained the Little Brown Jug trophy in a rivalry that had not been contested since 2017.

Michigan defeated Minnesota 49–24. On Michigan's opening drive, Preston Jelen blocked Will Hart's punt and recovered the ball at Michigan's 17-yard line. On its second play from scrimmage, Minnesota scored via a 14-yard touchdown pass from Tanner Morgan to Ko Kieft. Michigan tied the score via a 70-yard touchdown run from Zach Charbonnet. The Wolverines took the lead when Donovan Jeter recovered a Tanner Morgan fumble and returned it 15-yards for a touchdown. Brock Walker narrowed the lead to 14–10 with a 29-yard field goal. Michigan extended its lead to 21–10 on an eight-yard touchdown pass from Joe Milton to Ben Mason. In the second quarter, Minnesota scored on a 16-yard touchdown run from Mohamed Ibrahim. Michigan added 14 points on two four-yard touchdown runs from Hassan Haskins, which made the score 35–17 in favor of Michigan at half-time. The teams exchanged touchdowns in the third quarter via a five-yard touchdown run from Ibrahim for Minnesota and a two-yard touchdown run from Milton for Michigan. Michigan scored the only points of the fourth quarter via a five-yard touchdown run from Chris Evans.

In his first start at quarterback, Joe Milton completed 15 of 22 passes for 225 yards and one touchdown and rushed for 52 yards on eight carries. Ronnie Bell led the Wolverines' receivers with four catches for 74 yards.  Hassan Haskins led the backs with 82 rushing yards and two touchdowns on six carries.

Michigan's 49 points against Minnesota are the second-most points scored in a true road game against a ranked opponent in program history, trailing only those scored in a 54–51 loss at Northwestern in 2000. It also ties for the fifth-most points in a season-opening game in program history. Michigan's 35 points in the first half were the program's most against a ranked opponent in the AP Poll era. The game's officiating crew was entirely African American, the first in the Big Ten Conference.

Michigan State

Sources:

    
    
    
    
    
    
    
    

After facing Minnesota, Michigan hosted its in-state rival, the Michigan State Spartans in their home opener, facing Michigan State back-to-back at Ann Arbor for the first time since the 1967–68 seasons, in the battle for the Paul Bunyan Trophy. Last season, Michigan defeated Michigan State 44–10.

Michigan was upset by Michigan State 27–24. The teams exchanged touchdowns in the first quarter, on a 30-yard touchdown pass from Rocky Lombardi to Ricky White for Michigan State, and an eight-yard touchdown run from Blake Corum for Michigan. Michigan State regained the lead in the second quarter on a two-yard touchdown pass from Lombardi to Connor Heyward. Michigan responded with a 23-yard field goal by Quinn Nordin, which made the score 14–10 in favor of Michigan State at half-time. Michigan State extended its lead in the third quarter on a 27-yard field goal by Matt Coghlin. Michigan responded with a one-yard touchdown run from Corum to tie the game. Michigan State regained the lead with a 51-yard field goal by Coghlin. The teams exchanged touchdowns in the fourth quarter on a 13-yard touchdown pass from Lombardi to Connor for Michigan State and a two-yard touchdown run from Hassan Haskins for Michigan.

The official attendance of 615 was the smallest football crowd in Michigan Stadium history. Graduate student kicker Quinn Nordin was successful on his first field-goal attempt of the season for 23 yards in the second quarter. It was the 41st field goal of Nordin's career, which ranks fifth among Michigan's all-time leaders.

at Indiana

Sources:

    
    
    
    
    
    
    
    

Following its game against Michigan State, Michigan visited the Indiana Hoosiers. Last season, Michigan defeated Indiana 39–14.

Michigan lost to Indiana 38–21. Indiana opened the scoring in the first quarter via a 13-yard touchdown pass from Michael Penix Jr. to Miles Marshall. Michigan responded with a 37-yard touchdown pass from Joe Milton to Cornelius Johnson. Indiana re-gained the lead via a 24-yard touchdown pass from Penix to Ty Fryfogle. Indiana scored 10 points in the second quarter via a 52-yard field goal by Charles Campbell and a one-yard touchdown pass from Penix to Peyton Hendershot, which made the score 24–7 in favor of Indiana at half-time. The teams exchanged touchdowns in the third quarter via a 13-yard touchdown pass from Milton to Roman Wilson for Michigan and a one-yard touchdown run from Stevie Scott for Indiana. The teams exchanged touchdowns in the fourth quarter via a 21-yard touchdown pass from Milton to Ronnie Bell for Michigan and a two-yard touchdown run from Scott for Indiana.

Michigan's loss to Indiana snapped a 24-game series win streak for the Wolverines against the Hoosiers, this was their first loss to Indiana since 1987. With three successful PATs at Indiana, kicker Quinn Nordin moved into 12th place in all-time scoring for Michigan with 237 points.

Wisconsin

Sources:

    
    
    
    
    
    
    
    

After facing Indiana, Michigan hosted the Wisconsin Badgers. Last season, Michigan lost to Wisconsin 35–14.

Michigan lost to Wisconsin 49–11, their worst loss in Ann Arbor in 85 years, when they dropped a 38-0 decision to Ohio State. Wisconsin scored 14 points in the first quarter via a two-yard touchdown run from Nakia Watson and a one-yard touchdown pass from Graham Mertz to Mason Stokke. Wisconsin added 14 points in the second quarter via a one-yard touchdown run from Stokke and a 10-yard touchdown run from Watson, which made the score 28–0 in favor of Wisconsin at half-time. Michigan finally got on the board in the third quarter via a 46-yard field goal by Quinn Nordin. The teams exchanged touchdowns via a 13-yard touchdown pass from Mertz to Jake Ferguson for Wisconsin and a 23-yard touchdown pass from Cade McNamara to Mike Sainristil and a two-point conversion pass from Giles Jackson to McNamara for Michigan. Wisconsin added 14 points in the fourth quarter via a four-yard touchdown run from Danny Davis III and a 23-yard touchdown run from Jalen Berger.

Quinn Nordin's 46-yard field goal in the third quarter was his 14th career field goal at 40-yards or longer, setting a Michigan program record. With the loss to Wisconsin, Michigan had their first 1–3 start to a season since 1967.

at Rutgers

Sources:

    
    
    
    
    
    
    
    
    
    
    
    
    

After facing Wisconsin, Michigan traveled to Piscataway, New Jersey to face the Rutgers Scarlet Knights. Last season, Michigan defeated Rutgers in a blowout 52–0.

Michigan defeated Rutgers in triple overtime, 48–42. Rutgers opened the scoring in the first quarter via a three-yard touchdown run from Johnny Langan. Rutgers added 10 points in the second quarter via a one-yard touchdown run from Langan, and a 38-yard field goal by Valentino Ambrosio. Michigan finally got on the board later in the quarter via a 46-yard touchdown pass from Cade McNamara to Cornelius Johnson, which made the score 17–7 in favor of Rutgers at half-time. Michigan added 14 points in the third quarter via a 95-yard kickoff return by Giles Jackson and a nine-yard touchdown pass from McNamara to Nick Eubanks. Rutgers added 10 points via a 61-yard touchdown pass from Noah Vedral to Bo Melton and a 42-yard field goal by Ambrosio. Michigan added 14 points in the fourth quarter via a six-yard touchdown pass from McNamara to Mike Sainristil and a nine-yard touchdown pass from McNamara to Johnson, giving Michigan their first lead of the game. Rutgers responded with an 11-yard touchdown pass from Vedral to Aron Cruickshank and a Vedral two-point conversion run to tie the game and force overtime. After a scoreless first overtime period where both teams missed field goals, Rutgers scored via a 25-yard touchdown pass from Vedral to Jovani Haskins in double overtime. Michigan responded with a two-yard touchdown run from McNamara. In triple overtime, Michigan scored via a one-yard touchdown run from Hassan Haskins.

Michigan's 17-point comeback tied the third largest come-from-behind victory in program history and tied the second-biggest comeback on the road.

Penn State
 

Sources:

    
    
    
    
    
    
    

After facing Rutgers, Michigan hosted the Penn State Nittany Lions. Last season, Michigan lost to Penn State 21–28 in Penn State's annual White Out game.

Michigan lost to Penn State 27–17. Penn State opened the scoring in the first quarter via a six-yard touchdown run from Keyvone Lee. Michigan responded with a two-yard touchdown run from Hassan Haskins. Penn State scored 10 points in the second quarter via a 28-yard touchdown run from Sean Clifford and a 22-yard field goal by Jake Pinegar, which made the score 17–7 in favor of Penn State at half-time. The teams exchanged field goals in the third quarter, via a 40-yard field goal by Jake Moody for Michigan and a 33-yard field goal by Jake Pinegar for Penn State. The teams exchanged touchdowns in the fourth quarter, via a two-yard touchdown run from Haskins for Michigan and a two-yard touchdown run from Will Levis for Penn State.

With the rest of their season cancelled, the loss to Penn State meant Michigan won no games at home for the first time in program history; the Wolverines played their first game in Ann Arbor in 1883.

Roster

Awards and honors

2021 NFL Draft

References

Michigan
Michigan Wolverines football seasons
Michigan Wolverines football